Ximena Duque (born January 30, 1985) is a Colombian actress and model.

Biography 
Ximena was born in Cali, Valle del Cauca, Colombia, on January 30, 1985, and at age 12 moved to Miami, Florida, where she began to study acting, diction and accent neutralization.

Career

2002–2009: Beginnings 
Ximena got her start on the reality show Protagonistas de Novela, dedicated to seeking acting talents. In 2005, she began her acting career in the telenovela Soñar no cuesta nada, where she played Jenny. In 2007, she participated in Pecados Ajenos as María Águilar. The next year is part of the telenovela Valeria playing Ana Lucía Hidalgo. She was also part of the cast of the telenovela El Rostro de Analía, where she shared credits with Elizabeth Gutiérrez. In 2009, she had a minor role in the telenovela Victorinos. Throughout the years, Ximena Duque has acted in several telenovelas with Telemundo.

2010–present: New projects
In 2010, she starred in the telenovela Bella calamidades, a new version of the Cinderella Story. That same year, she also formed part of the cast of the telenovela Alguien te mira, a remake of Chilean telenovela. wherein she co-starred with David Chocarro and Géraldine Bazán. In 2011, she worked for the Univision television network, where she joined the cast of the telenovela Sacrificio de Mujer. During that same year, she had a lead role with Telemundo as Carola Conde joining the cast of La casa de al lado, in which Gabriel Porras and David Chocarro were the lead villains. In 2012, she obtained her second lead role  in the telenovela Corazón valiente, with Adriana Fonseca and Fabián Ríos. Through her role in this telenovela,  she obtained two awards including "The Perfect Couple" and "The richest Kiss", which she shares with Fabian Rios. In 2013, she starred in the telenovela Santa Diabla, as the main antagonist, in 2014 she won an award for "The Best Bad Girl" in Premios Tu Mundo. In that same year participated in the Web Novela Mía Mundo.

In late August 2014, actor David Chocarro, published through his Twitter a picture next to Ximena, recording the web where they appear novela Villa paraíso, in which she is the protagonist of the story. Ximena also talked a bit about her character in the telenovela that will air on Telemundo's channel:

When finished the recordings of the telenovela, actress ends her contract with Telemundo telenovela Dueños del paraíso, which will be released in 2015, confirmed that the actress would move to Hollywood with Carlos Ponce, for start working in movies and TV series. She then participated in 9 episodes of the popular soap opera Days of Our Lives as Blanca. She then rejoined Telemundo again and starred in ¿Quién es quién? as Clarita for 2 episodes. In 2017 she had her seventh lead role in La Fan as Adriana Zubizarreta.

Personal life

Duque has a son named Christian Carabias Duque, who was born on May 16, 2004.

From 2010 to 2016 she was in a relationship with actor Carlos Ponce.

In December 2016, Duque became engaged to Florida businessman Jay Adkins. The couple married in June 2017. She gave birth to their daughter, Luna Adkins Duque, on January 14, 2018. On February 06, 2021, after twenty hours of labor, she gave birth by Cesarean section to their second daughter Skye Adkins.

Filmography

Films

Television

Web

Awards and nominations

References

External links 

1985 births
Living people
People from Cali
Colombian telenovela actresses
Actresses from Cali
21st-century Colombian actresses